The following is a list of Texas county seat name etymologies, taken from the Handbook of Texas.  A separate list of Texas county name etymologies, covering Texas counties instead of its county seats, is also available.

A

B

C

D

E

F

G

H

J

K

L

M

N

O

P

Q

R

S

T

U

V

W

Z

References

Sources 
 Handbook of Texas Online.

Texas county seat name etymologies
County seat name etymologies